Crocus kosaninii  is a species of flowering plant in the genus Crocus of the family Iridaceae. It is a cormous perennial native to southern Serbia to Kosovo.

References

kosaninii
Flora of Serbia
Flora of Kosovo